Our Lady of Guadalupe Church & International Shrine of St. Jude is a Roman Catholic church located on Rampart Street in New Orleans, Louisiana. 

It is the oldest surviving church building in the city (originally established as the Chapel of St. Anthony of Padua), the back of the church is bordered by Basin Street, and the parish is predominantly African-American. The church is one of multiple parishes in the city that celebrates a weekly "Gospel Jazz Mass" on Sunday mornings.

Description
The church was built in 1827 and dedicated as a mortuary chapel for victims of yellow fever. It was erected close to St. Louis Cemeteries #1 and #2, the primary Catholic cemeteries at the time (St. Louis Cemetery #1 is located directly behind the church, right across Basin Street). At the time, it was thought that exhalations from the dead could spread the disease, so St Anthony's was established to relieve the burden then stretching St. Louis Cathedral thin. 

In 1918, Archbishop John Shaw asked the Missionary Oblates of Mary Immaculate to serve at the chapel (which had fallen into disuse), at which point the missionaries renamed it to its current moniker.

In the 1930s, parishioners praying to Saint Jude had their prayers answered, which resulted in a tradition of regular novenas to Saint Jude (that continues today) and the erection of a shrine to Saint Jude (which is still maintained today). The St. Jude Shrine is located in the area to the left of the altar, and it includes a relic of St. Jude.

The statue of Saint Expedite is also visited by Catholics, as well as some local followers of Voodoo.

The church grounds also feature a Marian grotto, located between the church and the adjacent rectory.

References

The history section of Our Lady of Guadalupe Chapel's website
http://www.neworleanschurches.com/olguadalupe/olguaralupe.htm

1826 establishments in Louisiana
19th-century Roman Catholic church buildings in the United States
Roman Catholic churches completed in 1826
Roman Catholic churches in New Orleans
African-American Roman Catholicism 
African-American Roman Catholic churches
Roman Catholic national shrines in the United States
Louisiana Voodoo